Radichev may refer to:

Radychiv, a village in Ukraine
Anton Radichev (born 1947), Bulgarian actor